Romulo may refer to:

People with the given name Romulo

Italian
 Rômulo (footballer, born 1987), Brazilian-born football player
 Romulo Cincinato (1502 – circa 1593), painter

Portuguese
 Rómulo (footballer, born 1976), football player

Mexican
 Rómulo Díaz de la Vega, interim president of Mexico in 1855
 Rómulo O'Farrill (1917–2006), businessman

Argentinian
 Rómulo Antonio Braschi (born 1941), independent Catholic bishop
 Rómulo García (1927–2005), Roman Catholic Archbishop
 Rómulo Macció (1931–2016), painter
 Rómulo Sebastián Naón (1875–1941), Ambassador to the United States

Venezuelan
 Rómulo Betancourt (1908–1981), 47th and 54th president of Venezuela
 Rómulo Gallegos (1884–1969), novelist
 Rómulo Gallegos Prize, a literary award named in Gallegos' honor
 Rómulo Gallegos Municipality (disambiguation), several places in Venezuela
 Rómulo Gallegos Center for Latin American Studies, a cultural studies foundation
 Rómulo Guardia (born 1961), film producer
 Rómulo Sánchez (born 1984), professional baseball player

Guatemalan
 Rómulo Méndez (born 1938), retired football referee

Peruvian
 Rómulo León (fl. 1988–1989), politician

Brazilian
 Rômulo (footballer, born 1982), football player
 Rômulo (footballer, born 1990), football player
 Rômulo Marques Macedo (born 1980), football player
 Rômulo Noronha (born 1987), football player
 Rômulo Cabral Pereira Pinto (born 1991), football player
 Romulo Pires (born 1983), male model
 Rômulo José Pacheco da Silva (born 1995), football player
 Rômulo Eugênio Togni (born 1982), football player

Filipino
 Romulo Neri (born 1950), politician
 Romulo Valles (born 1951), archbishop

People with the surname Romulo
 Alberto Romulo (born 1933), Filipino politician
 Bernadette Romulo-Puyat (born 1971), Filipina government administrator
 Carlos P. Romulo (1898–1985), Filipino diplomat, politician, soldier, journalist and author